Barn Elms Rowing Club is a rowing club in the east extreme of Barnes, London, close to Putney. The club or its basis was formed in 1967 and is located between Putney and Hammersmith Bridges, forming part of the larger Barn Elms Sports Centre. Opposite it on the river is Craven Cottage, the home of Fulham F.C. Its boathouse is shared with Parr's Priory Rowing Club and Putney High School Rowing Club.

Activities
Regular beginner courses.
Sessions for social juniors throughout the year and a junior racing squad.
Sessions for adults, from beginner courses to intermediate group sessions and private coaching.
Recreational and participation ethos for adults and juniors.
Tailored sculling or rowing courses for current clubs and local schools.
A working tank (indoor stationary, fixed rowing 'boat') for hire.

Honours

British junior championships

See also
Rowing on the River Thames

References

External links
 https://www.enablelc.org/bebh/ club's website

Tideway Rowing clubs
Sport in the London Borough of Richmond upon Thames
Rowing clubs of the River Thames